Eilif Magnus Brodtkorb (born 18 July 1936) is a retired Norwegian rower.

He was born in Holmestrand. Representing the club Bærum RK, he finished ninth in the coxed fours event at the 1964 Summer Olympics.

References

1936 births
Living people
Norwegian male rowers
Olympic rowers of Norway
Rowers at the 1964 Summer Olympics
People from Holmestrand
Sportspeople from Bærum